Lagmannsholmen was an island at the entrance to the western part of the harbor of Kristiansand in Agder county, Norway. 

Starting in 1686, the island was the site of the fleet station for the Danish-Norwegian galley fleet. Between the years 1750–1758,  construction was completed for a new headquarters and main station for the navy at Fredriksvern naval station and shipyard at Stavern in Vestfold.

During the 1960s and 1970s, the island was expanded and ultimately connected to the mainland in order to expand the western harbor in the port of Kristiansand.  Lagmannsholmen is now part of the mainland. It forms a part of Kristiansand's container port and is connected to the current Kristiansand Fish Wharf (Fiskebrygga). Most of the former islet consists today of large warehouses and a concrete grain silo.  There are few buildings dating from the former fortifications.

In May 2017 a new dock for cruise ships was put into operation at Lagmannsholmen.

References

Related reading
 

Forts in Norway
Fortifications of Kristiansand
Buildings and structures in Kristiansand